Abdulmajeed Al-Sulaiheem (born 15 May 1994) is a Saudi Arabian professional footballer who plays as a midfielder for Al-Nassr.

Career Statistics

Club
As of 30 May 2021

Honours
Al-Shabab
 King Cup: 2014
 Saudi Super Cup: 2014

Rayo Vallecano
 Segunda División: 2017–18

Al-Nassr
 Saudi Super Cup: 2020

References

External links
 
 

1994 births
Living people
Sportspeople from Riyadh
Saudi Arabian footballers
Association football midfielders
Saudi Professional League players
Al-Shabab FC (Riyadh) players
Rayo Vallecano players
Al Nassr FC players
Saudi Arabia international footballers
Saudi Arabian expatriate footballers
Saudi Arabian expatriate sportspeople in Spain
Expatriate footballers in Spain
Saudi Arabia youth international footballers